The Pitbull/Public Enemy Memorial Cup was a professional wrestling memorial event produced by the Pro Wrestling Unplugged (PWU) promotion, which took place on October 20, 2006, at Viking Hall in Philadelphia, Pennsylvania. The show was held in honor of the deceased members of The Pitbulls (Anthony Durante) and The Public Enemy (Rocco Rock and Johnny Grunge), both popular tag teams during the early years of Extreme Championship Wrestling, and featured some of the top tag teams on the independent circuit in an 8-team tournament. In keeping with ECW tradition, all matches were no-countout/no-disqualification. Twelve professional wrestling matches were featured on the event's card, with three including championships.

All Money Is Legal (K-Murda and K-Pusha) won the tournament by winning three matches at the event.  Over the course of the evening, they defeated The S.A.T. (Joel Maximo and Jose Maximo) in the quarter-finals, The Backseat Boyz (Johnny Kashmere and Trent Acid) in the semi-finals and The Rottweilers (Homicide and Ricky Reyes) in the final match. Tod Gordon and Gary Wolfe, the sole surviving member of The Pitbulls, presented the 7-foot trophy to All Money Is Legal following their victory. K-Murda and K-Pusha were joined in the ring by The Backseat Boyz and The S.A.T. who congratulated the winners by lifting them on to their shoulders while The Public Enemy's theme music played in the background.

Several other matches were held at the event in addition to the tournament. The main event was a standard wrestling match for the PWU Heavyweight Championship between the champion, Devon Moore, and the challenger, Azrieal, in which Azrieal won by countout. The undercard also featured Corporal Robinson successfully defending the PWU Hardcore Championship in three consecutive matches with victories over Aramis, KC Blade and Pete Hunter. The other match was for the PWU Unified Women's Intergender Championship, in which Mercedes Martinez successfully defended the belt in an intergender match against Detox and was awarded the match via disqualification.

A number of websites have given the show positive reviews; 411mania.com rated the event a 6.0 and  OnlineWorldofWrestling.com a 7.5 out of 10. Brett Schwan of WrestlingClothesline.com called the event "a very enjoyable DVD".

Results
October 20, 2006 in Philadelphia, Pennsylvania (Viking Hall)

Tournament brackets
The tournament took place on October 20, 2006. The tournament brackets were:

1.  Mark Briscoe was injured during the quarter-final match when his brother Jay accidentally hit him in the face with a steel chair. It was later announced that several of Mark's teeth had been knocked out and had to be taken to the hospital. Jay chose to continue the tournament with Joker, however, his new tag team partner turned on him allowing The Rotweillers to advance to the final.

References

External links
PWU Headlines: Official Pitbull/Public Enemy Memorial Cup!
PWU Headlines: Meet The Tag Teams...
PWU "Pitbulls/Public Enemy Memorial Tag-Team Tournament" October 20, 2006 at Foto-Mark.com

Professional wrestling memorial shows
2006 in professional wrestling
2006 in sports in Pennsylvania
Professional wrestling in Pennsylvania
Tag team tournaments